The West Second Street–Swartz Creek Bridge in Flint, Michigan, carries West Second Street over Swartz Creek. It was listed on the National Register of Historic Places in 1999.

History
The West Second Street Bridge was engineered in 1919 by the Flint City Engineer's Office under a royalty agreement with Daniel B. Luten, where the bridge utilized Luten's patented arch design. The Illinois Bridge Company of Chicago, a licensee for Luten, provided design assistance. The city solicited bids to construct the bridge, and awarded the construction contract to Price Brothers Construction Company of Lansing, Michigan, which underbid the Illinois Bridge Company. Work started on the bridge in the summer of 1919, and was completed in early 1920. It has continued to carry vehicular traffic since.

Description
The West Second Street Bridge is a 70-foot Luten arch bridge. The roadway is asphalt, flanked by cantilevered concrete sidewalks. The bridge is heavily skewed across the creek. Massive concrete abutments support the elliptical filled arch. It has a corbeled arch ring, and cast concrete balusters lining the bridge.

See also

References

External links
Photograph of Second Street Bridge

Road bridges on the National Register of Historic Places in Michigan
Bridges completed in 1920
Transportation in Genesee County, Michigan
National Register of Historic Places in Genesee County, Michigan
Arch bridges in the United States
Buildings and structures in Flint, Michigan